The 1965 Georgia Tech Yellow Jackets football team represented the Georgia Institute of Technology during the 1965 NCAA University Division football season. The Yellow Jackets were led by 21st-year head coach Bobby Dodd, and played their home games at Grant Field in Atlanta. They competed as independents, finishing the regular season with a record of 6–3–1. They were invited to the 1965 Gator Bowl, where they defeated Texas Tech, 31–21.

Schedule

Source:

References

Georgia Tech
Georgia Tech Yellow Jackets football seasons
Gator Bowl champion seasons
Georgia Tech Yellow Jackets football